LKY may refer to:

 Lake Manyara Airport's IATA airport code
 Lee Kuan Yew, founding father of Singapore
 Loh Kean Yew, Singaporean badminton player